The Harquahala Mountains (Yavapai: ʼHakhe:la) are the highest mountain range in southwestern Arizona, United States and are located southwest of the towns of Aguila and Wenden. The name originated from the Yavapai 'ʼHakhe:la", which means "running water". The range is oriented from northeast to southwest and is approximately 32 km long and 20 km at its widest point. At the northeast are two prominent peaks, Eagle Eye Peak and Eagle Eye Mountain.  One has a natural opening or bridge through it appearing as an eye high up, and is the namesake for the peaks and Aguila (Spanish for eagle). The highest point, Harquahala Peak, rises to 5,681 ft (1,732 m). Socorro Peak, 3270 ft (1,134 m), is at the southwest end of the range.

The very windy summit can be reached via a rough, 4-wheel drive road.  This high point was used by the U.S. Army in the 1880s as a heliograph station.  Then in 1920 a Smithsonian Astrophysical Observatory was constructed on this summit and operated for five years before being relocated to Table Mountain Observatory, near Wrightwood, California. Its purpose was to study variations in the solar output as a possible factor in climate prediction.

At the southwest end of the mountain range, there are gypsum mines and in the past there were extensive mines for gold and silver.

See also 
 List of mountain ranges of Arizona
 List of Arizona Wilderness Areas

References

Further reading
 
 Arizona Atlas and Gazetteer. DeLorme Mapping, Freeport, Maine.

External links
 Harquahala Mountains Wilderness - BLM
 Harquahala at wilderness.net
 Harqua Hala – Ghost Town of the Month at azghosttowns.com

Wilderness areas of Arizona
Mountain ranges of the Sonoran Desert
Mountain ranges of La Paz County, Arizona
Mountain ranges of Maricopa County, Arizona
Mountain ranges of Arizona
Bureau of Land Management areas in Arizona
Protected areas of Maricopa County, Arizona
Protected areas of La Paz County, Arizona